Booubyjan is a rural locality in the Gympie Region, Queensland, Australia.

Booubyjan is approximately  NW of Brisbane.

History
It was founded in the early 19th century by the Lawless brothers, Clement and Paul.

The town's name is believed to be an Aboriginal word, probably from the Waka language group, indicating turn back, which was originally used as the name for a pastoral run.

Land in Booubyjan was open for selection on 17 April 1877;  were available.

Booubyjan State School opened on 15 October 1934. It closed on 11 December 1987.

Heritage listings 
Booubyjan has a number of heritage-listed sites, including:
 Booubyjan Rd: Booubyjan Homestead

References

Further reading

External links 

Gympie Region
Localities in Queensland